Thayngen railway station is a railway station in the Swiss canton of Schaffhausen and municipality of Thayngen. Although the station is in Switzerland, it is located on the Deutsche Bahn's High Rhine Railway that links Basel to Singen.

Thayngen station is served by SBB GmbH/THURBO (until 2022 Deutsche Bahn) regional trains between Schaffhausen and Singen (Hohentwiel) and Zurich S-Bahn line S24 trains Between Zug and Thayngen (via Zurich).

Customs
Thanyngen is, for customs purposes, a border station for passengers arriving from Germany. Customs checks may be performed in the station or on board trains by Swiss officials. Systematic passport controls were abolished when Switzerland joined the Schengen Area in 2008.

Services
 the following S-Bahn services stop at Thayngen station:

References

External links
 
 

Railway stations in the canton of Schaffhausen
Swiss Federal Railways stations
Railway stations in Switzerland opened in 1863